The Oregon Ducks football program is a college football team representing the University of Oregon that is a member of the Pac-12 Conference. The team has had 35 head coaches since its founding in 1894. The Ducks have played in more than 1,100 games in 113 seasons. In those seasons, ten coaches have led Oregon to bowl games: Hugo Bezdek, Shy Huntington, Jim Aiken, Len Casanova, Rich Brooks, Mike Bellotti, Chip Kelly, Mark Helfrich, Mario Cristobal, and Dan Lanning.  Conference championships have been won by Huntington, Prink Callison, Jim Aiken, Casanova, Brooks, Bellotti, Kelly, and Mark Helfrich. Brooks is the all-time leader in games coached; Mike Bellotti holds the record for most victories, while Chip Kelly is the leader in win percentage for coaches with more than one season of service.

Of the 35 Oregon head coaches, three, Bellotti, Bezdek, and Casanova, are in the College Football Hall of Fame as coaches. John McEwan and Clarence Spears are also in the Hall of Fame, but as players at Army and Dartmouth. Brooks and Kelly have each received National Coach of the Year honors from at least one organization. Mark Helfrich (2013–2016), was promoted to head coach in 2013 following Chip Kelly's departure to the Philadelphia Eagles.

Dan Lanning is the current head coach of Oregon, having held the position since 2022 after Mario Cristobal left to take the head coaching job at Miami.

Key

Coaches

Gallery

Notes

References
General

Specific

Oregon

Oregon Ducks football coaches